The Pragmatic Web consists of the tools, practices and theories describing why and how people use information. In contrast to the Syntactic Web and Semantic Web the Pragmatic Web is not only about form or meaning of information, but about social interaction which brings about e.g. understanding or commitments.

The transformation of existing information into information relevant to a group of users or an individual user includes the support of how users locate, filter, access, process, synthesize and share information. Social bookmarking is an example of a group tool, end-user programmable agents are examples of individual tools.

The Pragmatic Web idea is rooted in the Language/action perspective.

Further reading 
 Hans Weigand, Adrian Paschke: The Pragmatic Web: Putting Rules in Context. RuleML 2012: 182–192 (paper), (presentation)
 Adrian Paschke, Harold Boley, Alexander Kozlenkov, Benjamin Larry Craig: Rule responder: RuleML-based agents for distributed collaboration on the pragmatic web. ICPW 2007: 17–28 (paper), (presentation)
 Adrian Paschke and Harold Boley. Rule Responder: Rule-based Agents for the Semantic-Pragmatic Web. International Journal on Artificial Intelligence Tools, 20(6):1043–1081, 2011, DOI: 10.1142/S0218213011000528. (paper)
 Paola Di Maio (2008) " The Missing Pragmatic Link on the Semantic Web", in: Business Intelligence Advisory Service Executive Update 8 (7)
 Alexander Repenning & James (2003) Sullivan "The Pragmatic Web: Agent-Based Multimodal Web Interaction"
 Munindar P. Singh (2004) "The Pragmatic Web: Preliminary Thoughts" in Proc. of the NSF-EU Workshop on Database and Information Systems Research for Semantic Web and Enterprises, April 3–5, Amicalolo Falls and State
 Schoop, M.; de Moor, A.; Dietz, J. (2006) " The pragmatic web: a manifesto", CACM 49 (5)
 Mareike Schoop, Aldo De Moor, Jan Dietz eds. (2006) Proceedings of the First International Conference on the Pragmatic Web, 2006, 21–23 September 2006, Stuttgart, Germany
  Proceedings ICPW'07: 2nd International Conference on the Pragmatic Web, 22–23 Oct. 2007, Tilburg: NL. (Eds.) Buckingham Shum, S., Lind, M. and Weigand, H.  & . Published in: ACM Digital Library & Open University ePrint 9275
 Pär J. Ågerfalk, Harry S. Delugach, Mikael Lind (Eds.): Proceedings of the 3rd International Conference on Pragmatic Web, ICPW 2008, Uppsala, Sweden, November 28–30, 2008. ACM 2008 ACM International Conference Proceeding Series 
 Adrian Paschke, Hans Weigand, Wernher Behrendt, Klaus Tochtermann, Tassilo Pellegrini (Eds.) 5th International Conference on Semantic Systems and 4th AIS SigPrag International Pragmatic Web Conference Track (ICPW 2009), Graz, Austria, September 2–4, 2009. Proceedings of I-KNOW ’09, I-SEMANTICS ’09, ICPW'09 2009  Verlag der Technischen Universität Graz ( pdf, html, rdf)
 Paschke, Adrian and Henze, Nicola and Pellegrini, Tassilo and Weigand, Hans: Proceedings of the 6th International Conference on Semantic Systems and the 5th International Conference on Pragmatic Web, Year of Publication: 2010, Publisher:ACM
 Adrian Paschke and Hans Weigand: 6th AIS SigPrag International Conference on Pragmatic Web (ICPW 2011), published in Chiara Ghidini, Axel-Cyrille Ngonga Ngomo, Stefanie N. Lindstaedt, Tassilo Pellegrini (Eds.):  Proceedings of the 7th International Conference on Semantic Systems, 7–9 September 2011, Messecongress|Graz, Austria, ACM 2011 ACM International Conference Proceeding Series   
 Adrian Paschke and Hans Weigand (Track Chairs): 7th AIS SigPrag International Conference on Pragmatic Web (ICPW 2012) – Track: Rule-Based Policies and Agents on the Pragmatic Web, published in Antonis Bikakis, Adrian Giurca (Eds.): Rules on the Web: Research and Applications - 6th International Symposium, RuleML 2012, Montpellier, France, August 27–29, 2012. Proceedings. Springer 2012 Lecture Notes in Computer Science

External links
 www.pragmaticweb.info
 Vi-Fi (“Visible - Findable”) - how to describe and to search sites with standard and universal semantic-pragmatic tree: Semantic Web as Pragmatic Web

Semantic Web